Uncut is a 1997 Canadian docudrama film written and directed by John Greyson.

Set in Ottawa in 1979, the film stars Matthew Ferguson as Peter Cort, a researcher writing a book on male circumcision, and Michael Achtman as Peter Koosens, his assistant who has a sexual obsession with Canadian Prime Minister Pierre Trudeau and regularly doctors photographs to depict himself and Trudeau in romantic entanglements.

They later meet Peter Denham (Damon D'Oliveira), a video artist who sets his films to Jackson Five songs. After Denham inserts photographs of Koosens and Trudeau into one of his videos, the three are arrested for copyright violation by an opera-singing police officer, put on trial in a courtroom scene set to La Habanera, and sent to a prison boot camp.

The film is also intercut with documentary footage of artists such as John Oswald, A. A. Bronson, Linda Griffiths and Thomas Waugh discussing censorship, as well as Trudeau himself invoking martial law during the 1970 October Crisis.

The film was inspired in part by the then emerging debate about outing closeted LGBT people, while the copyright themes were inspired by Greyson's battle with the estate of Kurt Weill over the use of parody versions of Weill songs in his early short film The Making of Monsters.

Cast
  Michael Achtman  ... Peter Koosens  
  Matthew Ferguson  ... Peter Cort  
  Damon D'Oliveira  ... Peter Denham  
  Maria Reidstra  ... Officer  
  Alexandra Webb  ... Defense Lawyer  
  Helene Ducharme  ... Judge  
  Daniel MacIvor  ... Newscaster  
  David Roche  ... Joe Typist  
  Shaftiq Ettienne  ... Fred Typist

References

External links

1997 films
Canadian drama films
English-language Canadian films
Films directed by John Greyson
Canadian LGBT-related films
LGBT-related drama films
1997 LGBT-related films
Cultural depictions of Pierre Trudeau
1997 drama films
1990s English-language films
1990s Canadian films